David Lee Hengel (born December 18, 1961) is an American former professional baseball outfielder. He played for the Seattle Mariners and Cleveland Indians of Major League Baseball (MLB).

Hengel attended the University of California and was drafted by the Mariners in the 3rd round of the 1983 MLB draft. He made his MLB debut on September 3, 1986, and appeared in his final game on June 27, 1989.

External links

1961 births
Living people
American expatriate baseball players in Canada
American expatriate baseball players in Japan
Baseball players from Oakland, California
Bellingham Mariners players
Calgary Cannons players
California Golden Bears baseball players
Chattanooga Lookouts players
Cleveland Indians players
Colorado Springs Sky Sox players
Lotte Orions players
Major League Baseball outfielders
Nippon Professional Baseball outfielders
Phoenix Firebirds players
Seattle Mariners players
Wausau Timbers players